Disodium phosphate (DSP), or disodium hydrogen phosphate, or sodium phosphate dibasic, is the inorganic compound with the formula Na2HPO4.  It is one of several sodium phosphates. The salt is known in anhydrous form as well as forms with 2, 7, 8, and 12 hydrates.  All are water-soluble white powders; the anhydrous salt being hygroscopic.

The pH of disodium hydrogen phosphate water solution is between 8.0 and 11.0, meaning it is moderately basic:
HPO42−  +  H2O      H2PO4−  +  OH−

Production and reactions
It can be generated by neutralization of phosphoric acid with sodium hydroxide:
H3PO4  +  2 NaOH   →   Na2HPO4  +  2 H2O

Industrially It is prepared in a two-step process by treating dicalcium phosphate with sodium bisulfate, which precipitates calcium sulfate:
CaHPO4  +  NaHSO4   →   NaH2PO4  +  CaSO4
In the second step, the resulting solution of monosodium phosphate is partially neutralized:
NaH2PO4  +  NaOH   →   Na2HPO4  +  H2O

Uses
It is used in conjunction with trisodium phosphate in foods and water softening treatment.  In foods, it is used to adjust pH.  Its presence prevents coagulation in the preparation of condensed milk. Similarly, it is used as an anti-caking additive in powdered products. It is used in desserts and puddings, e.g. Cream of Wheat to quicken cook time, and Jell-O Instant Pudding for thickening.  In water treatment, it retards calcium scale formation.  It is also found in some detergents and cleaning agents.

Heating solid disodium phosphate gives the useful compound tetrasodium pyrophosphate:
2 Na2HPO4   →   Na4P2O7  +  H2O

Laxative 
Monobasic and dibasic sodium phosphate are used as a saline laxative to treat constipation or to clean the bowel before a colonoscopy.

References

External links
 solubility in Prophylaxis alcohol

Sodium compounds
Phosphates
Edible thickening agents